Cephalopsis titillator is a member of the genus of flies in the family Oestridae. It is a nasal bot fly of dromedaries.

References

Further reading
 Includes images of larva, fly, and infested camel nasal cavity

Oestridae
Insects described in 1816